Nagarkurnool Lok Sabha constituency is one of the 17 Lok Sabha (Lower House of the Parliament) constituencies in Telangana state in southern India. This constituency is reserved for the candidates belonging to the Scheduled castes.

Pothuganti Ramulu of Telangana Rashtra Samithi is currently representing the constituency.

Assembly segments
Nagarkurnool Lok Sabha constituency presently comprises the following Legislative Assembly segments:

Members of Parliament

Election results

General Election, 2019

General Election, 2014

General Election, 2009

General Election, 2004

See also
 Mahbubnagar district
 List of Constituencies of the Lok Sabha

References

External links
 Nagarkurnool lok sabha  constituency election 2019 date and schedule

Lok Sabha constituencies in Telangana
Mahbubnagar district